St Anthony's Church, is in the village of Cartmel Fell, Cumbria, England.  It is an active Anglican parish church in the deanery of Kendal, the archdeaconry of Westmorland and Furness, and the diocese of Carlisle. The church is recorded in the National Heritage List for England as a designated Grade I listed building. Just to the southeast is Ravensbarrow Lodge.

History

St Anthony's was built in about 1504 as a chapel of ease to Cartmel Priory.  Lateral extensions were added to the north and south at the east end of the church in about 1520.  The south porch was added in the 16th century, and the vestry probably in the 18th century.  The church was restored in 1911 by John Curwen.

Architecture

Exterior
It is a long and low church standing on a hillside.  Constructed in roughcast stone with ashlar dressings, it has slate roofs.  Its plan consists of a three-bay nave and a chancel in a single range, a south porch, north and south extensions at the east end, and a west tower with a northeast vestry.  The tower has a saddleback roof, a blocked west doorway with an inserted window, and louvred bell openings.  Along the south wall of the church are three-light straight-headed windows, and a priest's door with a two-light window above it.  The east window in the chancel has five lights, and there are two small square windows, one above the other, to its side.  There are east and west entrances to the extension on the north side.

Interior
Under the tower is a baptistry containing a plain round font dated 1712.  Three elaborate pews have been constructed for the church.  The Cowmire Pew in the northeast of the church was probably created from a reredos and chancel screen in 1521.  It was restored in 1911.  It has possibly been used as a schoolroom, as there are inscribed calculation aids on a bench.  To the east of this is a smaller pew dated 1696.  In the southeast of the church is the Burblethwaite Pew, made in the 17th century, and reconstructed in 1810.  Opposite is a three-decker pulpit dated 1698 with a tester.  Also in the nave are Royal arms of 1781.  In the chancel is an 18th-century three-sided communion rail.  On the walls of the chancel are boards painted with the Lord's Prayer, the Creed, and the Ten Commandments.  The east window contains stained glass dating from about 1520; this was restored in 1911.  It contains depictions of St Anthony, St Leonard, the Crucifixion, and the Seven Sacraments.  There are also fragments of 16th-century glass in a north window.

External features

In the churchyard is a rectangular stone block with a rounded end and three steps.  This is thought to have been the base of a sundial, or possibly a mounting block, and is listed at Grade II.

See also

Grade I listed churches in Cumbria
Grade I listed buildings in Cumbria
Listed buildings in Cartmel Fell

References

External links

Photographs from Visit Cumbria
Photographs from Cumbrian Churches

Church of England church buildings in Cumbria
Diocese of Carlisle
Grade I listed churches in Cumbria